Ian Gordon Turner (May 11, 1925 – October 11, 2010) was an American competition rower and Olympic champion. He won a gold medal in coxed eights at the 1948 Summer Olympics, as a member of the American team. His brother David Turner was on the same Olympic team. Turner was born in Oakland, California and died there in 2010.

References

1925 births
2010 deaths
American male rowers
Rowers at the 1948 Summer Olympics
Olympic gold medalists for the United States in rowing
Medalists at the 1948 Summer Olympics